Podkočna is a settlement in the Municipality of Jesenice in the Upper Carniola region of Slovenia. A railway halt of the Bohinj Railway, the Kočna Rail Halt, is located in the village.

References

External links

Podkočna on Geopedia

Populated places in the Municipality of Jesenice